East Point City is a private housing estate and shopping centre in Hang Hau, Tseung Kwan O, New Territories, Hong Kong, near the Hang Hau MTR station. Built on reclaimed land and developed by Sun Hung Kai Properties, the estate consists of seven high-rise buildings and a two-storey shopping centre. A large-scale renovation of the shopping centre was completed in 2008.

Demographics
According to the 2016 by-census, East Point City had a population of 7,054. The median age was 41.6 and the majority of residents (90.4 per cent) were of Chinese ethnicity. The average household size was 3.4 people. The median monthly household income of all households (i.e. including both economically active and inactive households) was HK$59,160.

Politics
East Point City is located in Nam On constituency of the Sai Kung District Council. It is currently represented by Francis Chau Yin-ming, who was elected in the 2019 elections.

Gallery

References

External links

Official website of East Point City

Buildings and structures completed in 1997
Sun Hung Kai Properties
Private housing estates in Hong Kong
Shopping centres in Hong Kong
Tseung Kwan O
Hang Hau
1997 establishments in Hong Kong